Cicia is a genus of moths in the family Saturniidae first described by Oiticica in 1964.

Species
Cicia citrina (Schaus, 1904)
Cicia crocata (Boisduval, 1872)
Cicia nettia (Schaus, 1921)
Cicia norape Becker & Camargo, 2001
Cicia pamala (Schaus, 1900)
Cicia pelota (Schaus, 1905)

References

Ceratocampinae